Nosimo Zisiwe Beauty Balindlela (born 28 November 1949 in Hermanus, Cape Province) is a South African politician who served as the Premier of the Eastern Cape from 26 April 2004 until 1 August 2008. She changed parties in 2008 when she became a member of the Congress of the People, and again in 2012 to join the Democratic Alliance. In 2018 she defected back to the ANC.

Firing
In July 2008, Balindlela resigned from her position as premier after pressure from the National Executive Committee of the African National Congress, of which she was a member. Balindlela also subsequently resigned from "active" politics - however she still remained an active ANC PEC member. Both her "sacking" and that of the neighboring Western Cape's ANC premier Ebrahim Rasool were announced on the same day.

Her successor, Mbulelo Sogoni, was sworn in on 1 August 2008. She resigned from the ANC on 4 November 2008 to join the Congress of the People.

In November 2012 she joined the Democratic Alliance, her second change of political party. She became a member of parliament for the DA in May 2014, and served as Shadow Minister of Water and Sanitation until November 2016, when she transferred to the Eastern Cape Legislature.

References 

1949 births
Living people
People from Overstrand Local Municipality
Xhosa people
African National Congress politicians
Congress of the People (South African political party) politicians
Democratic Alliance (South Africa) politicians
Members of the National Assembly of South Africa
Premiers of the Eastern Cape
Teachers College, Columbia University alumni
21st-century South African women politicians
21st-century South African politicians
Women members of the National Assembly of South Africa
Women premiers of South African provinces